Blacklead Island is a Baffin Island offshore islet located in the Arctic Archipelago in Nunavut's Qikiqtaaluk Region.

History

The island had been used by the Inuit for whaling. Later used by Europeans, it was known as the Blacklead Island Whaling Station, and was designated a National Historic Site of Canada in 1985. In 1894 the whaling station was purchased by Mr. C. Noble and offered to Edmund Peck as an Anglican mission.

References 

Islands of Baffin Island
Islands of Cumberland Sound
National Historic Sites in Nunavut
Uninhabited islands of Qikiqtaaluk Region
Whaling stations in Canada
Whaling in Canada
Hudson's Bay Company trading posts in Nunavut
Former populated places in the Qikiqtaaluk Region
Protected areas established in 1985
1985 establishments in Canada